Actia is a genus of large flies in the family Tachinidae.

Species

Actia ampla Tachi & Shima, 1998
Actia antiqua (Mesnil, 1954)
Actia autumnalis (Townsend, 1917)
Actia brevis Malloch, 1930
Actia brunnea Malloch, 1930
Actia chrysocera Bezzi, 1923
Actia ciligera (Mesnil, 1954)
Actia clavula Tachi & Shima, 1998
Actia completa Malloch, 1930
Actia crassicornis (Meigen, 1824)
Actia cuthbertsoni Curran, 1933
Actia darwini Malloch, 1929
Actia dasymyia O'Hara, 1991
Actia deferens Malloch, 1930
Actia destituta Tachi & Shima, 1998
Actia diffidens Curran, 1933
Actia dimorpha O'Hara, 1991
Actia dubitata Herting, 1971
Actia eucosmae Bezzi, 1926
Actia exsecta Villeneuve, 1936
Actia fallax (Mesnil, 1954)
Actia fulvicauda Malloch, 1930
Actia gratiosa (Mesnil, 1954)
Actia hargreavesi Curran, 1933
Actia infantula (Zetterstedt, 1844)
Actia interrupta Curran, 1933
Actia jocularis Mesnil, 1957
Actia lamia (Meigen, 1838)
Actia lata Malloch, 1930
Actia linguata Mesnil, 1968
Actia longilingua (Mesnil, 1954)
Actia magnicornis Malloch, 1930
Actia maksymovi Mesnil, 1952
Actia mimetica Malloch, 1930
Actia mongolica Richter, 1976
Actia munroi Curran, 1927
Actia nigra Shima, 1970
Actia nigrapex Mesnil, 1977
Actia nigriventris Malloch, 1935
Actia nigroscutellata Lundbeck, 1927
Actia nitidella Villeneuve, 1936
Actia nitidiventris Curran, 1933
Actia nudibasis Stein, 1924
Actia oblimata Mesnil, 1957
Actia painei Crosskey, 1962
Actia pallens Curran, 1927
Actia pamirica Richter, 1974
Actia parviseta Malloch, 1930
Actia pellex (Mesnil, 1953)
Actia perdita Malloch, 1930
Actia philippinensis Malloch, 1930
Actia picipalpis (Mesnil, 1954)
Actia pilipennis (Fallén, 1810)
Actia pokharana Shima, 1970
Actia pulex Baranov, 1938
Actia quadriseta Malloch, 1936
Actia radialis O'Hara, 1991
Actia rejecta Bezzi, 1926
Actia resinellae (Schrank, 1781)
Actia rubiginosa (Mesnil, 1954)
Actia rufescens (Greene, 1934)
Actia russula Mesnil, 1977
Actia siphonosoma Malloch, 1930
Actia solida Tachi & Shima, 1998
Actia sternalis O'Hara, 1991
Actia takanoi Baranov, 1935
Actia tarsata Richter, 1980
Actia triseta (Mesnil, 1954)
Actia vulpina (Mesnil, 1954)
Actia yasumatsui Shima, 1970

The following species are unplaced in Siphonini:
Actia panamensis Curran, 1933

References

 
Brachycera genera
Tachinidae genera
Taxa named by Jean-Baptiste Robineau-Desvoidy